Bykhaw or Bykhov is a town in Mogilev Region, Belarus. As of 2009, its population was 17,031.

History

In the early modern times Bykhaw was an important fortress known for hard battles.

Bykhaw is known for its 17th-century synagogue. During World War II, Bychaw was occupied by the German Army from 5 July 1941 until 28 June 1944 and placed under the administration of the Generalbezirk Weißruthenien of Reichskommissariat Ostland. The Jews of Bykhov were killed in two mass shootings in September and November 1941. According to the German and Soviet archives, there were 4600 Jews from Bykhaw who were shot in Voronino.

There is an abandoned military airfield,  inside a military town called , which is now a microdistrict of Bykhaw.

References

External links 

 Bykhaw. Synagogues
 Places of interest and photos of Bykhaw on Radzima.org
 Jewish Encyclopedia
 The murder of the Jews of Bykhaw during World War II, at Yad Vashem website.

Bykhovsky Uyezd
Holocaust locations in Belarus
Populated places in Mogilev Region
Populated places on the Dnieper in Belarus
Towns in Belarus